The 2003 Men's NORCECA Volleyball Championship was the 18th edition of the Men's Continental Volleyball Tournament, played by eight countries from September 25 to September 30, 2003, in Culiacan, Sinaloa (Mexico).

Competing nations

Squads

Preliminary round

Group A

Honduras eventually did not play at the NORCECA Championship.
Thursday 2003-09-25

Friday 2003-09-26

Saturday 2003-09-27

Group B

Thursday 2003-09-25

Friday 2003-09-26

Saturday 2003-09-27

Final round

Quarterfinals
Sunday 2003-09-28

Semi-finals
Semi-finals

Finals
Monday 2003-09-29 — Fifth Place Match

Tuesday 2003-09-30 — Bronze Medal Match

Tuesday 2003-09-30 — Gold Medal Match

Final ranking

United States and Canada qualified for the 2003 FIVB Men's World Cup

Individual awards

Most Valuable Player

Best Blocker

Best Setter

Best Opposite

Best Server

Best Libero

Best Digger

Best Receiver

References
 Results

Men's NORCECA Volleyball Championship
N
N
Volleyball